
Gmina Lipnik is a rural gmina (administrative district) in Opatów County, Świętokrzyskie Voivodeship, in south-central Poland.

Villages
Gmina Lipnik contains the villages and settlements of Adamów, Gołębiów, Grocholice, Kaczyce, Kurów, Leszczków, Lipnik, Łownica, Malice Kościelne, Malżyn, Męczennice, Międzygórz, Słabuszewice, Słoptów, Sternalice, Studzianki, Swojków, Ublinek, Usarzów, Włostów, Zachoinie and Żurawniki.

Neighbouring gminas
Gmina Lipnik is bordered by the gminas of Iwaniska, Klimontów, Obrazów, Opatów, Wilczyce and Wojciechowice.

References
Polish official population figures 2006

Lipnik
Opatów County